Omer Baes (15 January 1889 – 5 May 1929) was a Belgian footballer. He played in two matches for the Belgium national football team in 1913.

References

External links
 

1889 births
1929 deaths
Belgian footballers
Belgium international footballers
Place of birth missing
Association football goalkeepers